The .219 Zipper cartridge was created by Winchester Repeating Arms in 1937 to be used in their lever-action Model 64 rifle. It is a 30-30 Winchester cartridge necked down to a .22 caliber bullet. Marlin Firearms also offered their Marlin Model 336 rifle (Marlin 336 Zipper) chambered for the cartridge.

While the .219 Zipper was supposed to compete against other varmint cartridges of the time, most lever-action rifles use tubular magazines, which prohibit the use of pointed bullets. This led to problems with accuracy. Winchester stopped producing .219 Zipper ammunition in 1962, Remington Arms stopped production of the cartridge soon afterwards. The .219 Zipper is the parent case of the .219 Donaldson Wasp, and P.O. Ackley created the .219 Zipper Improved in 1937.  Leslie Lindahl's Chucker and Super-chucker and "wildcat" case modifications by Hervey Lovell, Lysle Kilbourne, and W. F. Vickery offered similarly superior ballistics in stronger single-shot and bolt actions.

Though the flat- or round-nosed slug causes rapid loss of velocity, the .219 Zipper is suitable for small game or varmints, including wolf or coyote, and even deer if loaded with a heavier 55 grain bullet. It works well in guns designed to fire rimmed ammunition, such as rebarreled Steyr-Mannlicher M1895s or Lee–Enfields, but not in Mauser-type actions, which are not, although Winchester's Model 70, also a Mauser-type action, had been successfully adapted to semi- and fully-rimmed cartridges, such as the .220 Swift and the .219 Zipper.

Note
The ballistics data in the infobox are for maximum loads, as determined by the writers for Accurate Arms. This was based upon the Winchester Model 64 rifle being chambered in .25-35 WCF and .30-30 Winchester rather than SAAMI specifications.

See also
List of rifle cartridges

Notes

References
Barnes, Frank C., ed. by John T. Amber. ".219 Zipper", in Cartridges of the World, p. 9. Northfield, IL: DBI Books, 1972. .

External links
 219 Zipper Improved
 The .219 Zipper: A Good Cartridge That Didn’t Quite Pan Out

Pistol and rifle cartridges
Rimmed cartridges
Winchester Repeating Arms Company cartridges